People's Political Party can refer to several political parties:
People's Party of Canada (Federal Canadian political party)
People's Political Party (Jamaica)
People's Political Party (Saint Vincent and the Grenadines)
People's Political Party (Poland)
People's Political Party of Britain
The People's Political Party (Ontario, Canada)